Mosenthein Island, situated approximately  due north of the Gateway Arch in St. Louis, Missouri, and approximately  south of the confluence of the Missouri River and Mississippi River, is one of a cluster of three islands: Chouteau Island, Gabaret Island, and Mosenthein Island. Mosenthein Island is 1,077 acres in area. The island is mainly bottomland forest. It is only accessible by boat. It is a popular spot to camp and canoe.

References

Islands of the Mississippi River
River islands of Illinois